John Scott McRoberts (born 14 September 1962 at Scarborough, Ontario) is a Canadian paralympic sailor in the SKUD 18 class, who has competed in the 1996, 2008, and 2012 Paralympic Games.

Personal life 
McRoberts was born on 14 September 1962 in Scarborough, Ontario. He resides in Victoria, British Columbia. He became a quadriplegic at 18 years old after diving into shallow water.

References 

1962 births
Canadian male sailors (sport)
Living people
Paralympic bronze medalists for Canada
Paralympic gold medalists for Canada
Paralympic sailors of Canada
Sportspeople from Scarborough, Toronto
Medalists at the 1996 Summer Paralympics
Medalists at the 2008 Summer Paralympics
Paralympic medalists in sailing
Sailors at the 1996 Summer Paralympics
Sailors at the 2008 Summer Paralympics